Life in Mono is the third studio album by English pop singer Emma Bunton. The album was originally set for a November 2006 release in the UK, however it was later pushed back to 4 December 2006. Much like her previous album, Free Me, the album experiments with elements of 1960s pop music. For this particular album the musical arrangement was more directed towards 1960s French pop music, with some elements of British 1960s pop and Motown.

Background
The album was inspired by 1960s sounds, like motown, bossa nova and pop. Bunton had been working on her third release since winter 2004. The album's title track is a cover version of the hit "Life in Mono" by 1990s trip hop band Mono, best known through its usage in the 1998 film Great Expectations. The track "Take Me to Another Town" contains a sample from Herb Alpert's 1965 "Green Peppers". Songs recorded during this period that did not appear on the final album include "Crazy", "Rhapsody", "Secrets", "Crazy Beautiful", "Ladylike" and "In Another Life".

Due to Bunton's pregnancy all forms of promotion were cancelled after a few months. Rumors of a third single surfaced through websites  after Bunton stated she was thinking of releasing a third single, however this never came. The album tracks "I Wasn't Looking (When I Found Love)", "Perfect Strangers" and "Take Me to Another Town" were rumoured as choices for the third single.

Singles
The first single taken from the album was a cover of Petula Clark's 1964 hit single "Downtown". It was released on 13 November 2006. It was the 2006 BBC Children in Need official charity single and reached No. 3 on the UK Singles Chart.
The second single, "All I Need to Know" was released on 12 February 2007. It charted at No. 60 on the UK Singles Chart.

Critical reception

The Guardians Alex Macpherson found that Life in Mono "continues in the same vein" as previous album Free Me, "with breezy Motown rhythms and tastefully swooping strings offsetting Bunton's candyfloss-light vocals exquisitely. Though she has largely eschewed the playful pastiche that made Free Me such a triumph in favour of a more languid subtlety, it's still a sound no one else in British pop is pursuing. And it's difficult to think of anyone who could pull it off more delightfully than Bunton does [...] There's an undercurrent of vague wistfulness that never quite leaves her voice, lending it emotional clout beyond its technical limitations." Jaime Gill from Yahoo! Music UK called the album "a rather lovely record and quite possibly the last Spice-related release which anyone in the world barring immediate family members even vaguely cares about - she chose wisely. Like its charming predecessor Free Me, Life in Mono comes wrapped-up in a vogueish '60s French pop gleam, all sugary harmonies, luscious strings and crafty Bacharach style arrangements. 

MSN remarked that "while unlikely to be a chart topper, nevertheless Life In Mono is a charming record and reason enough for Emma to delay that pension-boosting Spice Girls reunion any time soon." Digital Spys Miriam Zendle opined that "there are a whole number of problems with this album, though Emma Bunton's voice is not one of them. It's utterly bland and very repetitive in terms of content. It seems to be geared very much towards the Christmas market and as such is incredibly cheesy and soft-focus. It's hard to find any tracks that really stand out, as they pretty much all sound exactly the same. Bunton's gentle, lovely vocals are the only thing that keeps the album from sinking into forgettability, but at the end of the day, it's just not enough." AllMusic editor Sharon Mawer called it "a safe album, light and fluffy with almost no substance". Talia Kraines from BBC Music felt that "there's little on this album that could see Emma bothering [another top 5 hit]. That's not to say little ol' Baby Spice hasn't tried [...] but while she may be continuing the Sixties vibe of Free Me, there's nothing that even flirts with the beehive razzamatazz of "Maybe"."

Chart performance
The album was Bunton's first not to reach the UK top 10. Life in Mono debuted on the UK Albums Chart at number 65 on 10 December 2006 and fell to number 75 in its second week before dropping out of the chart the following week.

Track listing

Charts

References

2006 albums
Emma Bunton albums
Universal Music Group albums